Trio me' Bumba' is a band established at Södermalm in Stockholm, Sweden in 1957. They broke through in 1963 with the song  "Spel-Olles gånglåt", charting for 30 weeks at Svensktoppen. One of their most famous songs is Man ska leva för varandra from 1968.

Citations

External links 

 

1957 establishments in Sweden
Musical groups established in 1957
Swedish musical groups